"Rose Tattoo" is a song by American Celtic punk band Dropkick Murphys. It was originally released as the lead single from the band's eighth studio album Signed and Sealed in Blood on November 7, 2012. It was re-recorded with featured vocals from Bruce Springsteen and re-released on May 14, 2013 as part of the Rose Tattoo: For Boston Charity EP, which was released shortly after the Boston Marathon bombing in April 2013. A music video for the original version of the song was uploaded on November 8, 2012 to the band's official YouTube channel. The version featuring Springsteen peaked at number 25 on the Billboard Hot Rock Songs chart.

Song Meaning
The rose tattoo itself appears on Casey's arm and is a memorial to his grandfather, who raised Casey after his father had died.

"He taught me most things that make me who I am today," Casey says. "He was a big union guy in Boston. It's in a visible place for me, and I look down and I see it a lot. He was such an inspiring man that it inspires me. Oftentimes, I just catch it out of the corner of my eye and it literally changes my mood when I think of him and what a strong individual he was."

Music video
The official music video for the song, lasting five minutes and twenty-six seconds, was uploaded on November 8, 2012 to the band's official YouTube channel.

Track listing

Original single

Rose Tattoo: For Boston Charity EP

Charts

Release history

References

External links
 
 https://www.npr.org/2013/01/01/168406178/the-dropkick-murphys-a-rose-tattoo-tells-a-life-story

2012 singles
2012 songs
Boston Marathon bombing
Dropkick Murphys songs